Hamilton City School District is a public school district serving students in Hamilton, Ohio. The school enrolls 10,125 students in the 2019–20 school year. Their mission statement is "Together, Positively Impacting Learning and Life".

School Board
The Hamilton City School board is the governing body of the school district. There are 5 elected members.
Current Members as of November 2019:
 Laurin Sprague, President
Mag Baker, Vice President
Shaquila Mathews
 Steve Isgro
Rob Weigel

Schools

Elementary schools
 Bridgeport Elementary School (2171 Bridgeport Drive, Hamilton)
 Brookwood Elementary School (1325 Stahlheber Road, Hamilton)
 Crawford Woods Elementary School (2200 Hensley Avenue, Hamilton)
 Fairwood Elementary School (281 North Fair Avenue, Hamilton)
 Highland Elementary School (1125 Main Street, Hamilton)
 Linden Elementary School (801 Hoadley Avenue, Hamilton)
 Ridgeway Elementary School (267 Wasserman Road, Hamilton)
 Riverview Elementary School (250 Knightsbridge Drive, Hamilton)

Middle schools
 Garfield Middle School (250 North Fair Avenue, Hamilton)
 Wilson Middle School (714 Eaton Avenue, Hamilton)

High schools
 Hamilton High School (Freshman Campus: 2260 NW Washington Blvd., Hamilton) (Main Campus: 1165 Eaton Avenue, Hamilton)
 The Miami School - alternative high school (140 Ross Avenue, Hamilton)

References

External links
 Hamilton City School District

School districts in Ohio
Education in Butler County, Ohio